Antena TV is a Peruvian television station, which transmits its signal since 2003, from Trujillo city for several cities of Peru. The channel is operated by Grupo NORTEL - RED TV company. It was one of the first regional channels airing in Trujillo city.

History
This regional television station in northern Peru was founded in April 2003, and since then transmits its signal from the city of Trujillo. It has repeaters in different cities of the north of the country.

See also
Trujillo
Victor Larco District

External links
Trujillo,  (Wikimapia)

References

Television stations in Trujillo, Peru